Nyons is a commune in the Drôme department in southeastern France.

History

Nyons was settled in the 6th century BC as Nyrax by a Gallic tribe, probably the Segusiavi or the Sequani. Hecataeus of Miletus mentioned Nyrax around 500 BC when writing about the Celts.
It is situated next to the river Aigues or Eygues, which is crossed by an ancient bridge.

Nyons has a very mild microclimate, which makes it a good place for people suffering from respiratory problems, for which there is a special clinic. It is famed for its olives (which have PDO status).

Nyons is a sub-prefecture of the department. It features two collèges and a lycée; as well as important shopping facilities and touristic attractions.

Geography
Nyons is approximately 120 km from Marseille and is located close to the boundary of the Vaucluse department.

Population

Sights
 Jardin des Arômes
 Nyons Bridge

International relations
Nyons is twinned with:
  Manciano, Tuscany, Italy
   Mechernich, North Rhine-Westphalia, Germany
 Nyon, Vaud, Switzerland
  Nules, Castellón, Spain
  Borca, Neamț, Romania

See also
 Baronnies
Communes of the Drôme department

References

External links

Populated places in pre-Roman Gaul
Roman sites in France
Communes of Drôme
Subprefectures in France
Dauphiné